Jurij Korenjak is a Slovenian slalom canoeist who competed from the mid-1990s to the mid-2000s. He won a bronze medal in the C-1 team event at the 2002 ICF Canoe Slalom World Championships in Bourg St.-Maurice.

References

Living people
Slovenian male canoeists
Year of birth missing (living people)
Medalists at the ICF Canoe Slalom World Championships